Fredonia may refer to:

Places

Colombia
 Fredonia, Antioquia, a town and municipality

United States
 Fredonia, Alabama, an unincorporated community
 Fredonia, Arizona, a town
 Fredonia (Biscoe), Arkansas, a city
 Fredonia, Indiana, an unincorporated community
 Fredonia, Iowa, a city
 Fredonia, Kansas, a city and county seat
 Fredonia, Kentucky, a city
 Fredonia Township, Michigan
 Fredonia, New York, a village
 Fredonia, North Dakota, a city
 Fredonia, Ohio, an unincorporated community
 Fredonia, Pennsylvania, a borough
 Fredonia, Gregg County, Texas, an unincorporated community
 Fredonia, Mason County, Texas, an unincorporated community
 Fredonia, Wisconsin, a village
 Fredonia (town), Wisconsin

Schools 
 State University of New York at Fredonia, a four-year public college
 Fredonia Blue Devils, the athletic programs of SUNY Fredonia
 Fredonia High School (disambiguation)

Historic places in the United States 
 Fredonia Church, Como, Mississippi, on the National Register of Historic Places
 Fredonia (Spartanburg County, South Carolina), a house formerly on the National Register of Historic Places listings in Spartanburg County, South Carolina (burned)

Other uses 
 Republic of Fredonia, a short-lived state created in the Fredonian Rebellion in 1826–1827 by settlers in Texas trying to secede from Mexico
 , a U.S. Navy bark
 Fredonia (automobile), manufactured in 1904 in Youngstown, Ohio
 Fredonia (grape), a variety of table grape
 Fredonia schooner, a type of schooner

See also 
 Freedonia (disambiguation)